The Professor of Music at Gresham College, London, gives free educational lectures to the general public. The college was founded for this purpose in 1597, when it appointed seven professors; this has since increased to nine and in addition the college now has visiting professors.

The Professor of Music is always appointed by the City of London Corporation.

List of Gresham Professors of Music
Note, years given as, say, 1596 / 7 refer to Old Style and New Style dates.

References

Sources
List of professors, Gresham College old website, Internet Archive, 2004.

Further reading
 

Music
1596 establishments in England